DoUlike2watch.com is a 2003 Canadian film.  Directed by Josh Levy, it was filmed in 2002 in Toronto, Ontario.  Co-authored by Levy and Paul Bellini, the play had a cast including PJ DeBoy and Nina Arsenault.

References

External links

2003 television films
2003 films
2003 thriller films
English-language Canadian films
Canadian thriller television films
2000s English-language films
2000s Canadian films